Naalya is a township in Kira Municipality, in Kyaddondo County, Wakiso District, in Uganda.

Location
Naalya is bordered by downtown Kira to the north, Kyaliwajjala and Namugongo to the northeast, Bweyogerere to the east, Kireka to the southeast, Banda to the south and Kiwaatule to the west and Najjera to the northwest. Alternatively, one can follow the Kampala Northern Bypass Highway, proceeding eastwards through Bukoto, Kiwaatule until one arrives at Naalya.

Overview
In the 21st century, Naalya is developing into a middle class residential neighborhood with high-rise apartment complexes and modest residential bungalows. The Kampala Northern Bypass Highway traverses the township as it courses its way from Bweyogerere to the east towards Kiwaatule, to the west of Naalya. In between the residences and highways, supermarkets and shopping malls are beginning to spring up. The Metroplex Shopping Mall, the largest shopping complex in Uganda, is located in Naalya, on the northern border of the Kampala Northern Bypass Highway.

Points of interest
These are some of the points of interest in or near Naalya:

 The Kireka-Namugongo Road - Leads to the Uganda Martyr's Basilica at Namugongo
 The Kampala Northern Bypass Highway - The highway goes through the township
 Naalya Housing Estate - A high-rise condominium and apartment complex constructed by National Housing and Construction Company 
 Naalya Secondary School - A private, mixed, non-residential high school (grades 8 - 13)
 Bethany High School - A private, upscale, mixed, day and boarding high school (grades 8 -13)

See also
 Central Region, Uganda

References

External links
 About Naalya Senior Secondary School
 About Bethany High School

Kira Town
Populated places in Central Region, Uganda
Cities in the Great Rift Valley